Kuutar, is the goddess of the Moon in Finnish mythology. She owns the gold of the Moon, spins golden yarns, and weaves clothes out of them. In Kalevala, young maidens ask Kuutar to give them some of her golden jewellery and clothes. She is described as a great beauty.

See also
 List of lunar deities

References

Finnish goddesses
Lunar goddesses